Dicyphus errans is a Palearctic species of  true bug

References
 

Dicyphini
Hemiptera of Europe
Insects described in 1804